Russell Clark may refer to:

 Russell Charles Clark (1878–1964), Prince Edward Island politician
 Russell Gentry Clark (1925–2003), United States federal judge
 R. Inslee Clark Jr. (1935–1999), United States educator, administrator
 Russell Clark (criminal) (1898–1968), American thief, bank robber and prison escapee
 Russell Clark (artist) (1905–1966), New Zealand artist 
Russell Clark, CEO Peel Thunder Football Club